Doctor's Lake West Water Aerodrome  is located on Doctor's Lake,  northwest of Nova Scotia Trunk 1 and north-northeast of Lake Milo and Yarmouth, Nova Scotia, Canada.

See also
Doctor's Lake East Water Aerodrome
Yarmouth Airport
Yarmouth (Regional Hospital) Heliport

References

Registered aerodromes in Nova Scotia
Seaplane bases in Nova Scotia